Khem Singh Bedi KCIE (21 February 183210 April 1905) claims he was a direct descendant of Guru Nanak, a leader, founder of the Singh Sabha in 1873. It instituted many charitable causes for Sikhs, was a landowner and politician in the Punjab during the British Raj.

Life
Bedi was born in Kallar Syedan in the Rawalpindi District in 1832. He claimed to be the thirteenth direct descendant of Guru Nanak Dev, the founder of Sikhism. His father Baba Attar Singh was killed in a family feud on 25 November 1839 and Bedi and his elder brother Sampuran Singh inherited jagirs in the Doaba region along with 41 villages in Depalpur Tehsil. Bedi held his jagirs in 4 villages of Dipalpur tahsil, while his elder brother was given jagirs in 22 villages of the same tahsil. Following the annexation of the Punjab by the East India Company in 1849, 14 of those villages were appropriated by the new administration.

In 1855, the Punjab administration established the Department of Public Instruction with the aim to open 30 single-teacher primary schools across the Punjab. Bedi lent his full support to the scheme, additionally opening his own schools in Rawalpindi. At least fifty schools for boys and girls were opened in the Punjab with his assistance.

During the Indian Mutiny of 1857, Bedi helped British troops quell an uprising in Gugera. He distinguished himself in a cavalry charge on 21 September 1857, and the following day narrowly escaped an ambush which killed the Extra Assistant Commissioner of Gogera, Leopold Fitzhardinge Berkeley. Following the rebellion, he was given a robe of honour and a double barrelled rifle.

On 1 October 1873 he co-founded the Singh Sabha Movement in response to growing Christian, Islam, Arya Samaj and Brahmo Samaj proselytising in the Punjab region. They campaigned for an inclusive interpretation that accepted wide range of beliefs drawn from Hinduism and Islam.

Bedi was a Sanatan Sikh (lit. "Traditional Sikh"), who maintained that "there were no essential differences between Sikhs and Hindus". Instead of treating the scripture as the only guru, Sanatan Sikh campaigned for acceptability of living gurus to guide those Sikhs who seek one which resulted in Khem Singh Bedi considering himself the Guru. The main text of the Sanatan Sikh was Dasam Granth created in 19th century. The dispute intensified and by the early decades of the 20th century, the influence of panth was given to Tat Khalsa ("pure, true Khalsa") resulting in the decline of Sanatan Sikhs.

He was appointed a magistrate in 1877 and made a Companion of the Indian Empire in 1879. On the occasion of his daughter's marriage in 1893, he donated Rs 3,00,000 for religious and charitable purposes. He was nominated to the Imperial Legislative Council in 1893 and became a Knight Commander of the Indian Empire in 1898. Throughout his life he added to the land he inherited to become a substantial landholder in the Punjab. Towards the end of his life, his land possessions in the Montgomery District alone amounted to 28,272 acres. He died in Montgomery on 10 April 1905.

References

1832 births
1905 deaths
People from Rawalpindi
Sikh politics
Knights Commander of the Order of the Indian Empire
Members of the Imperial Legislative Council of India
Indian landowners
19th-century landowners
20th-century landowners